Visagie is an Afrikaans surname of  Belgian origin.

Notable people with the surname include:

Alfred Visagie (born 1972), South African sprinter who competed at the 1996 Summer Olympics
André Visagie, former Secretary General of the far-right South African group, the Afrikaner Weerstandsbeweging (AWB)
Callie Visagie (born 1988), South African rugby union player
Cobus Visagie (born 1973), South African rugby union player
Gabriel Visagie (born 1992), Junior middle-distance runner who competed on national level in South Africa
Gawie Visagie (born 1955), South African rugby player
Guilliam Visagie (ca. 1751 – aft. 1793), Trekboer who settled in southern Namibia about 1786; the first person of European ancestry to settle in the country
Jaco Visagie (born 1992), South African rugby union player
Piet Visagie (1943–2022), South African rugby union player
Rudi Visagie (born 1959), South African rugby union player

Visagie history 
The current oldest known Visagie family member to move from Europe to South Africa is Pieter Visagie. Pieter Visagie was born in 1630, in Antwerp, Spanish Netherlands (present-day Belgium), to Guillaume Guillielmus Visagie and Catharina Wouters. Pieter married Catharina Catrina Pouisseon on June 21 1671, at age 41 in de Caep de Goede Hoop, the then Dutch Cape Colony in South Africa.

Surnames of French origin
Afrikaans-language surnames